The 1937 Humboldt State Lumberjacks football team represented Humboldt State College during the 1937 college football season. They competed as an independent.

The 1937 Lumberjacks were led by head coach Charlie Erb in his third and last year at the helm. They played home games at Albee Stadium in Eureka, California. Humboldt State finished with a record of four wins and two losses (4–2). The Lumberjacks outscored their opponents 119–27 for the season, which included three shutouts.

In three years under coach Erb, the Lumberjacks compiled a record of 15–6–1. That's the second highest winning percentage of any Humboldt State coach, behind Phil Sarboe at (.729).

Schedule

Notes

References

Humboldt State
Humboldt State Lumberjacks football seasons
Humboldt State Lumberjacks football